Route Mobile (formerly Routesms Solutions Ltd) is an Indian cloud communications platform as a service (CPaaS) company. Started in 2004 and headquartered in Mumbai, the company has presence in more than 15 locations across Asia-Pacific, Middle East, Africa, Europe and North America. In 2019, the company was named among the Fastest Growing Companies in Technology and Telecom sector and was 2nd top fastest-growing Indian company in the United Kingdom.

History 
Route Mobile was started in Mumbai in May 2004 as a cloud communications platform provider for over the top (OTT) and mobile network operators (MNO).

Acquisition and partnership 
In May 2017, Route Mobile acquired Call 2 Connect, an  ITES Provider based out of India.

In the same year, Route Mobile acquired 365squared, a SMS Firewall company based out of Malta.

Route Mobile partners with companies including Idea Cellular, Lanka Bell, and Arab Financials Services for providing messaging services in India, Sri Lanka, Middle-East and North Africa region.

Honours and awards
 October 2020: A Representative Vendor in the Gartner Market Guide for Communications Platform as a Service (CPaaS).
 2020: Moved to 269th rank in Next Fortune 500 category.
 2019: The Best Messaging Innovation – Consumer Solution Award at Messaging and SMS Global Awards, London.
 2019: The Fastest Growing Indian Technology and Telecom Company Award in UK at India Meets Britain Tracker 2019.
 2020: Among the most fastest growing companies in Technology & Telecom sector and overall 2nd in the UK's top fastest growing Indian companies in the United Kingdom 2020.
 2019: The Best Governed Company in the unlisted segment (Emerging Category) award at the 19th ICSI National Award for Corporate governance.

References

External links 
 Route Mobile

Mobile telecommunications
Mobile technology companies
Cloud communication platforms
Software companies of India
Companies based in Mumbai
Indian companies established in 2004
2004 establishments in Maharashtra
Software companies established in 2004